Nasini is an Italian surname. Notable people with the surname include:

Francesco Nasini (1611 or 1621–1695), Italian Baroque painter
Giuseppe Nicola Nasini (1657–1736), Italian Baroque painter, son of Francesco

See also
Nalini

Italian-language surnames